Gunnar Hellström (6 December 1928 – 28 November 2001) was a Swedish actor and director.

Partial filmography

 While the City Sleeps (1950) - Young Man in Restaurant
 U-Boat 39 (1952) - Harriet's Escort
 She Came Like the Wind (1952) - Olle
 Barabbas (1953) - Worker in Pottery (uncredited)
 Marianne (1953) - Birger Wessel
 The Chieftain of Göinge (1953) - Lars Paulinus
 Karin Månsdotter (1954) - Bonde
 Simon the Sinner (1954) - Simon Angus
 Night Child (1956) - Nils Gustaf Boman
 Synnöve Solbakken (1957) - Aslak
 The Judge (1960) - Albert Arnold, Lawyer
 Karneval (1961) - Gösta Nordström
 Return to Peyton Place (1961) - Nils Larsen
 Rififi in Stockholm (1961) - Erik Johansson
 Combat! (1962-1963, TV Series) - Lt. Leibner - German Paratrooper / Dr. Belzer
 Nightmare (1965) - Per Berg
 The Time Tunnel (1967, Episode 'The Ghost of Nero") - German Major
 Mission: Impossible (1967-1969, TV Series) - Friedrich Spindler / Frederick Rudd
 Djungeläventyret Campa-Campa (1976) - Fader John
 Jag rodnar (1981) - Gunnar Sjöman
 Raskenstam (1983) - Gustav Raskenstam
 Dallas (1989, TV Series) - Rolf Brundin
 Zorn (1994) - Anders Zorn (final film role)
 Gunsmoke (1967-1975, 33 Episodes) - as Director

External links

1928 births
2001 deaths
Swedish male film actors
20th-century Swedish male actors